This is a list of public art in Ward 1 of Washington, D.C.

This list applies only to works of public art accessible in an outdoor public space. For example, this does not include artwork  visible inside a museum.

Most of the works mentioned are sculptures. When this is not the case (i.e. sound installation, for example) it is stated next to the title.

References

Ward 1
Public art in Washington, D.C.